Yelena Viktorovna Davydova (born 7 August 1961) is a Russian-Canadian gymnastics coach and judge who competed for the former Soviet Union. She was the women's artistic individual all-around champion at the 1980 Summer Olympics in Moscow. She's the owner and head coach at Gemini Gymnastics, a gymnastics club in Oshawa, Ontario. In July 2012, Davydova was one of the coaches of the Canadian Women's Artistic Gymnastics Team. In 2016 Davydova was head floor judge at the 2016 Rio Olympics.

In October 2016, she was elected a member of the International Gymnastics Federation's Women Technical Committee.

Early life
Davydova was born in Voronezh, 500 kilometres south of Moscow, to Victor, a mechanic, and Tamara, an employee at the Leningrad Optical and Mechanical Works. She became interested in gymnastics at age six after seeing on television the famous Soviet Olympic gold medallists Larisa Petrik and Natalia Kuchinskaya. She wanted to be enrolled in Spartak Gymnastics school, but was turned away for having the wrong physique.

Soon a coach at the school, Gennadiy Korshunov, noticed her. He invited her into the school. He asked his wife, Ina, also a gymnastics coach at the school, to train Davydova in her group. Yuri Shtukman, the administrator at the school, did not like this initiative by his new training staff and reprimanded the Korshunovs; however he allowed Davydova to stay in the school. It soon became apparent that she was a talented gymnast and Gennadiy took over her coaching himself. By 1972 Davydova was the best in her age group at the school.

Davydova has a brother, Yuri, who is 12 years her junior.

Gymnastics career

In 1973 Davydova won her first international tournament. In 1974 she became a member of the USSR junior squad. At the 1975 USSR Junior Championships Davydova finished 3rd AA and won golds on vault and bars. Following her success here she became a member of the senior squad. In March 1976 Davydova achieved second place all-around at the USSR championships, in her first try as a senior. She also won the gold on bars and a silver on floor. At the inaugural American Cup, Davydova performed a side somersault on the beam, the first woman ever to do so. However, she only received third place AA. At the USSR Cup Davydova tied for sixth place AA – and won bronze on vault, only 0.025 behind world vault champion Olga Korbut – but only the top five and one gymnast in ninth place were chosen for the Soviet Olympic team.

In August Davydova won the Antibes tournament in France. In addition, she won gold on the vault, and silvers on beam, bars, and floor. At the Riga International she scored the highest per-routine score in the competition (9.75 on vault), and won silver in the AA competition. She dominated event finals, winning three gold (beam, vault, bars) and a bronze on floor. In October, she was made a member of the USSR gymnastics display team, which visited the UK. She subsequently performed her beam routine on the Blue Peter show.

In December 1976, Davydova finished third AA at the Chunichi Cup in Japan, and won a gold on vault and a bronze on floor at the Tokyo Cup. She was the only woman in the competition to perform a front somersault vault. She also tied for first AA with Kische and Kraker of East Germany. In 1977 Davydova again won the gold medal on bars at the USSR Cup, scoring a perfect 10.

In September 1977 Davydova appeared on the front cover of a new magazine with an emphasis on young gymnasts, entitled Gymnastics World. She was one of the four "Mighty Mites" featured in that issue. She was also a member of the USSR Display Team, along with Kim, Korbut, Grosdova, Filatova and Gorbik that performed in Great Britain.

Davydova suffered a serious injury when a bone detached itself from her knee. The injury could have been a career-ender, but she recovered.

In 1978 Gennady Korshunov and his wife were invited to coach gymnastics in Leningrad. Davydova and her family moved along with the Korshunov family. She achieved a silver AA at the Spartakiade of Russian Federation Sports Schools meet, and bronze AA at the USSR Cup, being the top scorer on both beam and bars. Shortly after, Davydova won the AA title at the prestigious Chunichi Cup in Japan defeating Maxi Gnauck. Her win by 0.55 points remains the joint third-highest margin of victory in the competition's 34-year history. She also won gold on the bars and vault at the Tokyo Cup. As a result, she was chosen to be a member of the USSR team at the World Championships at Strasbourg in France. However, on the day of competition she was named as an alternate, and unable to compete.

At the 1979 Coca-Cola International in England, Davydova won a gold on floor and but lost gold on bars, after her coach blocked the line of vision of one of the judges, and she suffered the mandatory 0.3 deduction. She finished second AA at the Simo Sappien memorial tournament in Finland. Davydova was unable to attend the 1979 World Championships in Fort Worth, U.S., because of influenza. At the World University Games in Mexico she won team gold, bronze AA, and a silver medal on floor and bronze on vault.

In 1979 Olga Korbut named Davydova, Stella Zakharova, and Natalia Shaposhnikova as the three most promising young gymnasts.

1980 Olympic Games
At the 1980 Moscow News Tournament Davydova performed a full-on, full off vault. that had had only ever been done before by Olga Korbut. Davydova won a gold and 3 silver at the Moscow News Tournament. At the 1980 USSR Championships in April in Kiev Davydova won gold on vault- unveiling her unique vault full twist on, front somi off, scoring a 10 – and finished 3rd AA.

The Soviet Olympic gymnastics team was to be chosen after the USSR Cup competition. Davydova had finished joint 6th at the 1976 USSR Cup but that turned out to be insufficient to be placed on the team. Davydova won the all-around and scored a 10 on floor. Davydova subsequently was named to the Olympic team.

At the Olympics Davydova qualified for the all-around, vault and beam finals. The Soviet team won team gold and Davydova went on to win the all-around gold medal, and silver on the balance beam.

Post-Olympics
On 3 July 1981 in Montreux, the 100th anniversary celebration of the International Gymnastics Federation took place. Davydova was invited to perform her floor exercise.
In August Davydova won the tournament in Giresum, Turkey. She won the AA title and was top scorer on vault, bars, floor and joint top scorer on beam. She scored 10's on bars and floor.

At the 1981 USSR Championships, Davydova won the All-Around title plus golds on floor and vault and bronze on bars. She also participated in the 1981 World Championships, her last major international event. The USSR won team gold. Davydova suffered a serious neck injury in pre-competition warm up but still finished 3rd all-around with a fall and was the only gymnast from any nation to make all 4 event finals. She won silver on floor and bronze on bars.

Davydova remained on the Soviet display team until 1984 but retired from competitive gymnastics in late 1982. She was competing on vault at the Rome gymnastics Grand Prix in 82 when she injured her ankle. She didn't want to finish Elite competition gymnastics and talked of defending her Olympic title in L.A. but it became obvious as time went on that her body could no longer stand the pounding of intense workouts.

After retirement
Davydova attended the Leningrad University of Physical education and later received her doctorate in Pedagogical science at the P.F. Lesgraft State Institute of Athletic Education. The title of her thesis was "Nontraditional preparation of top gymnasts for competitions."

Davydova was part of the Saint Petersburg delegation that had bidden unsuccessfully to host the 2004 Olympic Games.

On 11 May 2007 Davydova was inducted into the International Gymnastics Hall of Fame (IGHOF).

Coaching career
Upon graduation in 1987, Davydova began coaching and served as an international Brevet judge. She began her coaching career with the Leningrad Olympic reserve college and was a coach with the Soviet national gymnastics team.

Davydova now owns Gemini Gymnastics, a high performance gymnastics club in Oshawa, Ontario where she has been a coach since immigrating to Canada, and Head Coach since 1999. Some of her better known gymnasts include Stephanie Capucitti, Sarah Deegan, Danielle Hicks, Katherine Fairhurst, Kristina Vaculik, Brittnee Habbib, Kelsey Hope and Ava Stewart. She was beam coach for the Canadian women's team at the 1995 World Championships and one of the Canadian women's team coaches at the 2002 Commonwealth Games. Davydova was twice named Gymnastics Canada Gymnastique coach of the year.
In October 2005 Davydova was chosen for the Coaching Association of Canada's Women in Coaching National Team Coaching Apprenticeship Program.

In 2005, 2006 and 2010 Gymnastics Canada Gymnastique awarded Davydova and long-time associate coach, Valery Yahchybekov, as the "Junior High Performance Coaches of the Year". Gemini Gymnastics has been recognised by GCG as Club of Excellence for 10 consecutive years since the inception of the awards in 2001. In 2006 Gemini received the prestigious Gymnastics Canada Ed Broughan award for "Club of the Year". As of 2012 Gemini have produced 15 Canadian AA champions,8 Elite Canada AA champions, 21 Eastern Canada AA champions, 98 Ontario provincial AA champions plus gymnasts who have won a host of other medals and awards. In 2012 Gemini was awarded a Club of Excellence award, 1 of only 4 recognised across Canada, and 1 of 2 to earn the highest gold level honour. In April 2012 Davydova was named Ontario's Coach of the Year.

In 2012, Kristina Vaculik, who was coached by Elena and Valery Yahchybekov at Gemini Gymnastics, was named to the Canadian Olympic team for the London 2012 Summer Olympic Games.

Davydova coached Canadian gymnast Ava Stewart at the 2020 Summer Olympic Games in Tokyo.

Gymnastics Judge
Davydova became a gymnastics judge in 2005 and if the only Olympic all-around champion to do so.

In August, 2016, Davydova represented Canada as a judge at the 2016 Rio Olympics in Women's Artistic Gymnastics. She was named as head judge for the women's floor events at the Olympics.

Legacy
Davydova advanced the difficulty of gymnastics, and is one of a select few to have introduced a new move and/or trend on each piece of apparatus. Davydova was the first female gymnast to perform an Arabian 1¾ somersault, and a piked Arabian 1¾ somersault on floor (both Arabian 1¾ moves removed from the code of points for female gymnasts by the FIG in 1993 for safety reasons, effectively banned because of their danger and difficulty.

Eponymous skills
Vault: Full Twisting Handspring forward onto table – tucked salto forward

Uneven Bars: Swing forward counter-straddle reverse hecht over high bar to regrasp (D); almost universally referred to as a Tkatchev which is the name of the skill in Men's Artistic Gymnastics

Competitive History

Personal life
Davydova married boxing coach Pavel Filatov on 1 June 1983. They have two sons, Dmitrii (born 21 February 1985) and Anton (28 June 1995. The family moved to Canada in 1991.

References

On-line sources
 https://web.archive.org/web/20060402212327/http://geminigymnastics.com/
 http://www.ighof.com
 http://www.geocities.com/tatiana_lysenko/list.html http://www.geocities.com/tatiana_lysenko/list.html

Off-line sources
 International Gymnast Magazine
 February 1977, pp. 28–30
 July 1980, p. 30
 August 1980, p. 26
 September 1980, pp. 6, 15, 29.
 October 1980, pp. 11, 21
 November 1980, pp. 30–31
 December 1980, pp. 48–50, 62, 70.
 March 1981, p. 6
 August 1981, pp. 42–43
 January 1982, p. 28
 March 1982, p. 75
 January 1998, p. 49
 July/August 2007, p. 36
 July/August 2010, pp. 19, 29.
 British Gymnast magazine
 September 1980, pp. 7, 11, 13–15, 21–24, 26, 31
 April 1981, pp. 11, 21–24
 September 1981, p. 29
 November 1981, p. 25
 FIG World Gymnastics magazine
 Vol 2, num 3
 Vol 3, num 1
 Vol 4, num 1.
 March 2008, pp. 8–9.
 FIG Bulletin May 1983.
 Daily Mirror Official Programme USSR Display Team 1977 and 1980.
 Soviet Gymnastic Stars, Vladimir Golubev,1979, pp. 163, 207.
 638 Olympic Champions, Valeri Steinbach,1984, pp. 217, 218.
 Wonderful moment of victory, 1983, pp. 8–14.
 Artistic Gymnastics: A history of development, Anton Gadjos,1997, pp. 264, 265.
 Winning Women : The Changing Face of Women in Sport, p. 96, Tony Duffy and Paul Wade, .
 The Golden Decade : women's gymnastics in the 1980s – volume 1 – 1980–1984, Karen Inskip-Hayward.
 The United States Olympic Book 1980, published by United States Olympic Committee.
 The Book of Olympic Lists 2012 p. 96 David Wallechinsky and Jaime Loucky .
 The Complete Book of the Olympics 2012 Edition p. 784–5 David Wallechinsky and Jaime Loucky .
 The Official History of the Olympic Games and the IOC Athens To London 1894–2012 p. 235 David Miller

External links
 

1961 births
Living people
Olympic gold medalists for the Soviet Union
Olympic silver medalists for the Soviet Union
Soviet female artistic gymnasts
Olympic gymnasts of the Soviet Union
Olympic medalists in gymnastics
Gymnasts at the 1980 Summer Olympics
Spartak athletes
Medalists at the World Artistic Gymnastics Championships
People from Voronezh
Medalists at the 1980 Summer Olympics
Originators of elements in artistic gymnastics